The epithet "the White" may refer to:

Cleitus the White  (died 318 BC) an officer of Alexander the Great 
Konrad X the White (1420-1492), Duke of Oleśnica, Koźle, Bytom and half of Ścinawa
Leszek the White (c. 1186–1227), Prince of Sandomierz and High Duke of Poland
Olaf the White, a Viking sea-king of the latter half of the 9th century
Otto III, Duke of Swabia (died 1057), also Margrave of the Nordgau
Władysław the White (between 1327 and 1333-1388), Duke of Gniewkowo

In legend and fiction:
Elyan the White, a Knight of the Round Table in Arthurian legend
Gandalf, in J.R.R. Tolkien's The Lord of the Rings 
Saruman, in J.R.R. Tolkien's The Lord of the Rings
Tirant the White, protagonist of the Catalan romance Tirant lo Blanch, published in 1490

See also
List of people known as the Black
List of people known as the Red

Lists of people by epithet